Macacine gammaherpesvirus 12 (McHV-12) is a species of virus in the genus Rhadinovirus, subfamily Gammaherpesvirinae, family Herpesviridae, and order Herpesvirales.

References 

Gammaherpesvirinae